The Municipality of Apače is a municipality in Slovenia. It lies in the traditional region of Styria in northeastern Slovenia and belongs to the Mura Statistical Region. The municipality borders on the municipalities of Šentilj, Sveta Ana, and Gornja Radgona. The Mura River is the border between Slovenia and Austria. The seat of the municipality is the town of Apače. The municipality was established in 2006 and split from the Municipality of Gornja Radgona on 1 January 2007.

Settlements
In addition to the municipal seat of Apače, the municipality also includes the following settlements:

 Črnci
 Drobtinci
 Grabe
 Janhova
 Lešane
 Lutverci
 Mahovci
 Nasova
 Novi Vrh
 Plitvica
 Podgorje
 Pogled
 Segovci
 Spodnje Konjišče
 Stogovci
 Vratja Vas
 Vratji Vrh
 Žepovci
 Zgornje Konjišče
 Žiberci

References

External links
 
 Municipality of Apače on Geopedia
 Apače municipal site

 
2006 establishments in Slovenia
Apace